Thaumastoderma is a genus of gastrotrichs belonging to the family Thaumastodermatidae.

The species of this genus are found in Europe.

Species

Species:

Thaumastoderma antarctica 
Thaumastoderma appendiculatum 
Thaumastoderma heideri

References

Gastrotricha